Albert Roy Mitchell (April 19, 1885 – September 8, 1959) was a professional baseball player.  He was a right-handed pitcher over parts of seven seasons (1910–1914, 1918–1919) with the St. Louis Browns, Chicago White Sox and Cincinnati Reds.  For his career, he compiled a 32–37 record in 122 appearances, with a 3.42 earned run average and 204 strikeouts.  Mitchell was a member of the 1919 World Series champion Cincinnati Reds, though he did not play in the World Series.

He was born in Belton, Texas and later died in Temple, Texas at the age of 74.

See also
 List of Major League Baseball annual saves leaders

External links

1885 births
1959 deaths
People from Belton, Texas
Major League Baseball pitchers
Baseball players from Texas
St. Louis Browns players
Chicago White Sox players
Cincinnati Reds players
Minor league baseball managers
Temple Boll Weevils players
San Antonio Bronchos players
Fort Worth Panthers players
Houston Buffaloes players
Venice Tigers players
Vernon Tigers players
Oklahoma City Indians players
Dallas Submarines players
Dallas Steers players
Temple Surgeons players